Stanley Andrew Rojek (April 21, 1919 – July 9, 1997) born in North Tonawanda, New York was a shortstop for the Brooklyn Dodgers (1942 and 1946–47), Pittsburgh Pirates (1948–51), St. Louis Cardinals (1951) and St. Louis Browns (1952).

He helped the Dodgers win the 1947 National League Pennant. He worked in his family's dairy, 'Rojek's Dairy'.

He finished 10th in voting for the 1948 NL MVP for leading the league in Games (156), At Bats (641), Plate Appearances (713) and Singles (150).  He also had 85 Runs, 186 Hits, 27 Doubles, 5 Triples, 4 Home Runs, 51 RBI, 24 Stolen Bases, 61 Walks, .290 Batting Average, .355 On-base percentage, .367 Slugging Percentage, 235 Total Bases and 8 Sacrifice Hits. 

In 8 seasons he played in 522 Games and had 1,764 At Bats, 225 Runs, 470 Hits, 67 Doubles, 13 Triples, 4 Home Runs, 122 RBI, 32 Stolen Bases, 152 Walks, .266 Batting Average, .327 On-base percentage, .326 Slugging Percentage, 575 Total Bases and 35 Sacrifice Hits. His career fielding percentage was .966.

He lockered next to Jackie Robinson, in Brooklyn, when Jackie broke baseball's colored barrier. Rojek was one of the only players who was kind to Jackie. 

Rojek was very poor. When he wasn't playing baseball or helping with his brothers' families, he was driving the family milk truck and working the business. The dairy was called "Rojek's Dairy", and Stan would assist his brother, Theodore, with the milk bottle and cream cheese deliveries.

He died in his hometown at the age of 78. In dedication, he has a baseball field named after him in his hometown, North Tonawanda.

References

External links
 

1919 births
1997 deaths
Baseball players from New York (state)
Major League Baseball shortstops
Brooklyn Dodgers players
Pittsburgh Pirates players
St. Louis Cardinals players
St. Louis Browns players
People from North Tonawanda, New York
Olean Oilers players
Dayton Wings players
Durham Bulls players
Montreal Royals players
Toledo Mud Hens players
Charleston Senators players
Mobile Bears players
St. Paul Saints (AA) players
Burials in Buffalo, New York